Forest Service may refer to:
 Canadian Forest Service
 Indian Forest Service
 New Zealand Forest Service
 United States Forest Service
 Forestry Commission in the United Kingdom
 Forest Service Northern Ireland

Government agencies by type